Lasht-e Nesha District is a district (bakhsh) in Rasht County, Gilan Province, Iran. At the 2006 census, its population was 36,316, in 11,006 families.  The District has one city: Lasht-e Nesha. The District has three rural districts (dehestan): Aliabad-e Ziba Kenar Rural District, Gafsheh-ye Lasht-e Nesha Rural District, and Jirhandeh-ye Lasht-e Nesha Rural District.

References 

Rasht County
Districts of Gilan Province